WRBJ-FM (97.7 MHz) is an urban contemporary radio station in Jackson, Mississippi, but licensed to Brandon, Mississippi.  The station is owned and operated by Roberts Broadcasting, former owners of The CW television affiliate WRBJ.  Its studios are located at The Roberts Building along State Street in Jackson, just two blocks north of the Mississippi State Capitol building, and the transmitter tower is south of Brandon.

With the bankruptcy sale of all their other television stations to the Trinity Broadcasting Network and Ion Television, as of February 2014, WRBJ-FM is the only asset remaining with the formerly television-heavy company.

Station history
The station was originally paired with WRKN 970 AM in Brandon, Mississippi, with the call letters WRJH (initially standing for Roy and June Harris, who were the original owners).  Both stations were promoted as "Gospel 97" for many decades.  The callsign also came to mean other things as well (We're Raising Jesus Higher).  After Mr. Harris died, Mrs. Harris sold the station to On Top Communications.  On Top Communications bought the station in 2000 for the price of $1,600,000.00.

After that time, the WRJH callsign took on a different meaning ("We aRe Jackson's Hot 97.7).  At approximately the same time, On Top Communications, was in the process of acquiring several other stations, including Urban/Hip Hop stations in New Orleans, Albany, Georgia and Norfolk.  When On Top went bankrupt in 2005, most of its stations either switched formats or went silent (as the case with New Orleans due to Hurricane Katrina).

A short time later, WRJH was sold at a bankruptcy auction.  That was when Roberts Broadcasting bought WRJH for $1,950,000.00, eventually moved its studios into TV station WRBJ's and changed the callsign to WRBJ.

WRBJ's playlist mainly consists of Hip Hop and R&B.  Unlike most stations, this one plays smoother music during the workday timeframe while it plays newer music later afternoons into the early evening, thus positioning WRBJ well with its competitors WJMI, WJDX-FM, WRTM-FM and WKXI-FM.

The WRBJ call letters were previously assigned to AM 1580 and FM 92.1 in Saint Johns, Michigan, from the mid-1960s until August 1981.  The original WRBJ-AM-FM was owned by Ditmer Broadcasting, which was headed by Robert D. Ditmer.

WRBJ bans offensive music
In response to the Don Imus controversy, WRBJ's owner, Roberts Broadcasting, took a stand on excessively violent and derogatory hip hop lyrical content.  Rev. Jesse Jackson and Rev. Al Sharpton have long taken a stand against, and hip-hop mogul Russell Simmons began to stand up against it as well, calling on people to accept "social responsibility."  Inspired by the move, Roberts Broadcasting, after much reviewing of playlists for content, decided to create a policy to ban the station from playing music that glorifies violence and degrades women as of April 2007.  The purpose was to take a stand against racism, self-racism (in the case of Blacks using the N-word against each other), and promote pride in the African American community by fighting against the oppressive media. While the revamping of the playlist may not be noticeable to listeners, the owner said that any songs on WRBJ-FM containing content considered offensive (other than censored language) will be removed.  And it may go on to drop syndication rights to the Russ Parr Morning Show as well, claiming that the morning jock is a borderline shock jock.  This is the first time a radio station owner has done this since Clear Channel banned certain songs from airplay in response to 9/11.

WRBJ-FM is no longer Hot
On Monday, March 17, 2008, WRBJ-FM reimaged itself as just 97-7 (WRBJ).  The station has fewer hip-hop songs and more R&B music.  Russ Parr's morning show has been replaced by that of Rickey Smiley.  Upcoming changes for WRBJ-FM include several hours' worth of urban gospel every Sunday, a public affairs program and neo-soul.  From September 2008 to April 2013, WRBJ was Jackson's affiliate of Michael Baisden in the afternoons; as of August 2013 it now airs the D.L. Hughley show in Baisden's former slot.

References

External links
WRBJ "97.7 FM" Official website

Urban contemporary radio stations in the United States
RBJ-FM